Stephen Hotter (born 2 December 1969) is a New Zealand cricketer. He played in 24 first-class and 17 List A matches for Wellington from 1988 to 2000.

See also
 List of Wellington representative cricketers

References

External links
 

1969 births
Living people
New Zealand cricketers
Wellington cricketers
Cricketers from New Plymouth